The Mexican Riviera refers collectively to twenty cities and lagoons lying on the western coast of Mexico. Although there are long distances between these cities, they are often collectively referred to as the Mexican Riviera because of their many oceanfront resorts and their popularity among tourists. Cruise ships often visit three or four of these destinations on their longer cruises. In a 2005 interview Stanley McDonald, the founder of Princess Cruises, mentioned:

The call of the "Mexican Riviera" was coined by Princess Cruise Line. Now everyone refers to it as the Mexican Riviera. I believe that it really spoke to the quality and beauty of what people would see down there. We all know the French Riviera -- the Mexican Riviera was something we had in the western hemisphere.

Some of the many areas that are considered part of the Mexican Riviera, listed in order from north to south:

Ensenada, Baja California 
Cabo San Lucas, Baja California Sur 
Mazatlán, Sinaloa 
 San Blas, Nayarit 
Puerto Vallarta, Jalisco 
Manzanillo, Colima 
The Ixtapa resort near Zihuatanejo, Guerrero 
Acapulco, Guerrero 
 Puerto Escondido, Oaxaca
 Huatulco
 Salina Cruz, Oaxaca 

Ports in the states of Oaxaca and Nayarit are also included.

In 2011, Carnival Cruise Lines, Disney Cruise Line and Norwegian Cruise Line all dropped Mazatlan port calls from their itineraries, citing concerns over an increase in drug gang turf war there. Royal Caribbean dramatically scaled back its presence in all of the Mexican Riviera that same year, canceling 15 cruises that were scheduled to sail through the region in 2011. The cruise line cited economic reasons for its decision.

Riviera in Italian means simply "coastline". The word by itself often refers to either the French Riviera or the Italian Riviera. Riviera may be also applied to any coastline, especially one that is sunny, topographically diverse and popular with tourists.

The term “The Riviera of Mexico” was used in reference to Acapulco Beach in the 1945 Walt Disney film, The Three Caballeros.

Many of the locations listed above were regular stops on the TV series The Love Boat.

See also
Riviera (disambiguation)
Riviera Maya
Riviera Nayarit

References

External links

.
.
.
Tourism in Mexico
Acapulco
Puerto Vallarta